Matarratas is the first album from Chilean band Fiskales Ad-Hok. The resources used in its creation were quite makeshift, so the record suffers from a rather poor sound quality.

Track listing
 "No Aguanto Más!"
 "Estúpidos Policías"
 "Lorea Elvis"
 "Con la Represión te acuestas"
 "De que Sirve"
 "Almorzando Entre Muertos"
 "Santiago Violento"
 "Los Malditos"
 "Odio"
 "Anarkia y Rebelion!"

Personnel
Álvaro España – lead vocals
"Cyril" – guitar
"Pogo" – guitar and vocals
"Polo" – drums
"Roly Urzua" – bass

Fiskales Ad-Hok albums
1987 debut albums
Self-released albums
Spanish-language albums